Rosedale is a residential neighbourhood in the northwest quadrant of Calgary, Alberta. It is located south of the Trans-Canada Highway, between 4th and 10th Street NW. To the south it is bounded by McHugh Bluff Park and the community of Sunnyside.

It is represented in the Calgary City Council by the Ward 7 councillor.

Demographics

Residents in this community had a median household income of $78,067 in 2000, and there were 8% low income residents living in the neighbourhood. As of 2000, 14.7% of the residents were immigrants. A proportion of 14.4% of the buildings were condominiums or apartments, and 23.2% of the housing was used for renting.

Education
The Rosedale Elementary & Junior High public school is located in this community.

See also
List of neighbourhoods in Calgary

References

External links

Neighbourhoods in Calgary